Voskevan is a village in the Noyemberyan Municipality of the Tavush Province of Armenia. The nature around the village is forested, consisting of numerous mountains and canyons.

Toponymy 
The village was previously known as Koshkotan or Ghoshghotan.

Economy 
The majority of the population are engaged in agriculture.

References

External links 
 Economy of Voskevan 
 

Populated places in Tavush Province